The brunette is a French song form popular in the late seventeenth and eighteenth centuries. Among those who worked in the form was Jacques Hotteterre, who published a collection of flute arrangements of airs and brunettes around 1721.

References

Baroque music
Song forms
French music
17th-century music genres
18th-century music genres